The 1991 Boston University Terriers football team was an American football team that represented Boston University as a member of the Yankee Conference during the 1991 NCAA Division I-AA football season. In their second season under head coach Dan Allen, the Terriers compiled a 4–7 record (3–5 against conference opponents), finished in three-way tie for fourth place in the Yankee Conference, and were outscored by a total of 292 to 232.

Schedule

References

Boston University
Boston University Terriers football seasons
Boston University Terriers football